The Nagold Dam (also Erzgrube) is a dam in the German state of Baden-Württemberg. It was built between 1965 and 1970, and provides flood and drought protection in the Nagold valley. The dam lies within the county of Freudenstadt and was taken into service in 1971, and the nearest settlement is Seewald-Erzgrube.

Leisure 
Its location in the middle of a 650 hectare protected area in the Black Forest makes the impounded Nagold Reservoir a popular recreation area. From 1 April to 30 September, sailing is permitted on the lake. The dam has a pre-dam about 800 metres above the head of the reservoir.

Gallery

See also 
List of dams in Germany

Literature 
Peter Franke, Wolfgang Frey: Talsperren in der Bundesrepublik Deutschland,  DNK – DVWK 1987, .

External links
Seewald-Erzgrube

Dams completed in 1970
Black Forest
Dams in Baden-Württemberg
Freudenstadt (district)